A manta ray night dive is a scuba diving excursion to view manta rays.

Description
Depending on the amount of microscopic plankton present, the number of manta rays will vary. Some days no manta rays are seen while on days with high plankton levels upwards of a dozen may be present. While diving, scuba divers shine lights up while snorkelers shine them down creating a column of light which attracts millions of minuscule plankton, which in turn attracts the manta rays.

A popular site is just off the coast of Hawaii Island called Garden Eel Cove, as well as the Kona Surf Hotel. 
Located just off the coast of Keahole Point (near the Kona International Airport), it attracts scuba divers for the abundance of manta rays.
Other sea life includes garden eels, Hawaiian turkeyfish, and Heller's barracuda.

History
For decades travelers to Hawaii observed manta rays from restaurants and hotels along the coast, such as the Mauna Kea Beach Hotel and the in 2002 closed Kona Surf Hotel. In 1992, dive operators began occasionally taking scuba divers to areas such as the Kona Surf Hotel for manta ray encounters. The frequency of these dive trips increased over the years with many dive operations offering trips most days.

Travel guides often rate this dive highly.
The Professional Association of Diving Instructors states that "dive magazines the world over consistently rank Kona's manta ray night diving as one of the best things you can do underwater".

In 2017, the 3 most popular sites to do the manta ray night dive on the Island of Hawaii are (from south to north) (1) in front of the Sheraton Kona Resort & Spa at Keauhou Bay (formerly known as the Kona Surf Hotel, the dive spot is called 'Manta Village'), (2) in front of the Kona International Airport at Keahole, Hawaii (also called 'Garden Eel Cove' or 'Manta Heaven'), and (3) between Kawaihae harbor and the Kohala resorts.

Conservation and the Manta Pacific Research Foundation

With the increasing popularity of this dive the conservation and protection of manta rays has become a priority for dive operators and organizations. Manta rays in other parts of the Pacific Ocean have been hunted by fishermen as a result of the increasing demand for manta ray gill plates. Local organizations, such as the Manta Pacific Research Foundation, try to protect the local manta rays and educate the public about manta rays and other sea life. The Manta Pacific Research Foundation's mission is to "study manta rays in their natural habitat, conduct scientific research, provide education programs for the public about manta rays and the marine environment, and to establish and promote global manta ray conservation". As a result of manta rays' fragile biological composition, guidelines to protect the health of the manta rays at this dive have been set forth by The Ocean Recreation council of Hawaii and PADI's Project AWARE. The guidelines are strictly enforced by dive operations that conduct this dive.

Dive shops
Several dive shops in Kailua-Kona and offer one-tank or two-tank dives. Most dive trips depart from Honokohau harbor, which is only a short trip to the dive site.
Manta ray diving tours on Hawaii occur year-round; they are not limited by seasons.

References 

Biota of Hawaii (island)
Tourist attractions in Hawaii County, Hawaii
Outdoor recreation
Hawaii (island)